Arcata and Mad River Transit System (AMRTS) is a fixed-route bus service for Arcata, California.  The service is subsidized by Humboldt State University and offers free rides to students. Because of this relationship, Arcata has remarkably good transit service for its size.

The transit service operates 3 routes, Gold, Red, and Express. The express route only operates when HSU is in session. Hours for other routes are limited when HSU is out of regular session. AMRTS offers limited Saturday service.

In 1974, the City Council of Arcata chose to use its allotment of SB 325 money for a public mass transit system. In April 1975, the new bus service within Arcata city limits was inaugurated and named the Arcata & Mad River Transit System.

External links 
 Arcata and Mad River Transit System

Arcata, California
Bus transportation in California
Public transportation in Humboldt County, California
1975 establishments in California